Asia is the twenty-third studio album by Japanese rock band Boris. It was first announced via the band's Facebook page on April 30, along with simultaneous releases of Urban Dance and Warpath. They were first available on tour with Endon, making their release date May 2.

The album is almost entirely noise experimentation, with elements of drone music as well, and is entirely instrumental, all in keeping with the styles used on its simultaneously-released companions, as well as previous drone albums like The Thing Which Solomon Overlooked - Chronicle.

The cover art posted by the band is inaccurate to the physical product, which features a young Japanese girl dressed as a ballerina.

Track listing

Personnel
 Atsuo
 Wata 
 Takeshi

References

External links
Discogs release page

2015 albums
Boris (band) albums